Unniyarcha is a legendary  warrior and heroine 16th century mentioned in the Vadakkan Pattukal, a set of historical ballads from northern Kerala, a state in southwestern India. She was a member of a Thiyyar Community family of Puthooram Veed in Kadathanad. Her father's name was Kannappa Chekavar. She is believed to have lived in the northern part of Kerala during the 12th century. She is a popular character in Kerala's folklore, and is remembered for her valour and skills in Kerala's native martial art, Kalaripayattu. According to legend, Unniyarcha was most known for her deadly skill with the whip-like Urumi, a unique type of sword that is native to Kerala. Like most traditional Kalaripayattu practitioners, she began training at the kalari at the age of seven.

There are so many such instances in Vatakkan Pattukal, the narrative poems about warrior heroes and heroines prevalent in Kerala , who won or lost in some of the famous duels of Kalarippayattu. Among these songs, the fight of Unniyarcha, the female warrior, who fought against several men with a winding sword called Urumi, specially used for Kalarippayattu, to safeguard herself and her husband from a planned attack of some thieves, is very popular.

Biography
Attummanammel Unniyarcha was from the famous Puthooram Veedu of Kadathanad (Vadakara), a region in northern Kerala. Unniyarcha was married to Attumanammel Kunjiraman. Many Thiyyar families today trace their roots to this Chekavar lineage, and to mythological fighters such as Unniyarcha and her brother, Aromal Chekavar.  Attummanammel Kunjiraman had a kalari known as Puthussery Kalari, which remains in the Kannur district of Kerala to this day. History has it that Unniyarcha won 64 kalari ankam in her youth. She was the sister of Aromal Chekavar and Unnikannan. Unniyarcha rejected the romantic advances of Chandu Chekavar (also known as Chanthu Chekavar), which led to the murder of her brother Aromal. Aromalunni, the son of Unniyarcha, later took revenge against Chanthu to avenge his uncle. Unniyarcha is revered in Kerala, especially among Kalaripayattu practitioners, for her martial skill, courage and beauty. 

Unniyarcha is perhaps the most exceptional of all the 'heroines' of North Malabar. Also known as Archa, she became synonymous with empowered independent women in Kerala. Her name became a symbol of beauty, bravery and fierce independence among Keralite women.

Nadapuram Fight
According to historian A Sreedhara Menon, Unniarcha Even in her childhood she mastered the technique of warfare by undergoing a rigorous course of training in the Kalari. She was the very embodiment of female heroism and many are the deeds of gallantry attributed to her in the northern ballads. She had married one Attummanammel Kunhiraman who was literally a coward. One day after her marriage Unniarcha set out from home to see the Kuthu in Allimalarkavu, the Vilakku in Ayyappankavu and the  Velapuram in Anjanakavu (the version in the ballads). As the Mappilas (Jonakas) in the bazar on the way were a much dreaded lot, her husband and relatives did not approve of her journey. In spite of this, she was determined to go for these festivals. Her husband Kunhiraman had no other alternative but to accompany her. As was expected, she was waylaid at Nadapuram by the Mappilas. Though Kunhiraman was in jitters, Unniarcha showed her mettle by facing her adversaries almost single-handed. The ballads so goes Nadapuram "Kerala History and Its Makers" mention her caustic comments about the nervous behaviour of her husband. ("Though a woman, I do not shiver. Then why should you, a man, shiforc)The headman of the chanakas (Yavanas) who happened to see her on the way, was enamoured of her beauty and sent his men to carry her away by force. Unniyarcha drew her sword and killed some of them. The rest fled and brought the headman himself to the scene, who soon discovered that she was the sister of his fencing master. He appealed to both the brother and sister to pardon him, but Unniyarcha was inexorable and challenged him and his men to a fight.
 
The Mappilas soon realised that their opponent was none other than the brave sister of Aromal Chekavar whom their leader (Muppan) had held in great awe and respect. Having realised his mistake the Muppan tried to do his best to pacify her, but she would not pardon him without a categorical assurance that women would be allowed to walk along that way without any fear of molestation. Even the intercession of the wife of the ruling chieftain or of the influential Chetti who was the friend of Chekavar failed to win her over. At last Aromal Chekavar himself appeared on the scene. Only after the Muppan tendered wholesome apology and offered all kinds of gifts did she calm down and make peace with her adversaries. The chief of the place, who was appealed to, persuaded the girl to sheath her sword, which she did on the headman promising that no woman of the place would be molested in future.

In popular culture 
The legend of Unniyarcha has been made into films such as:
 Unniyarcha (1961) 
Aromalunni (1972)
 Oru Vadakkan Veeragatha (1989)
 Puthooramputhri Unniyarcha (2002).
 A television serial titled Unniyarcha was aired on Asianet (2006).
 Her character was also shown in Veeram (2016)

See also
 Calicut
 Kannur
 Chekavar

References

Indian women in war
Women in 16th-century warfare
16th-century Indian people
Indian warriors
Thiyyar warriors
16th-century Indian women
Military personnel from Kerala
Women from Kerala